The Melkite Greek Catholic Church, or Melkite Byzantine Catholic Church, is an Eastern Catholic church in full communion with the Holy See as part of the worldwide Catholic Church. Its chief pastor is Patriarch Youssef Absi, headquartered at the Cathedral of Our Lady of the Dormition, Damascus, Syria. The Melkites, who are Byzantine Rite Catholics, trace their history to the early Christians of Antioch, formerly part of Syria and now in Turkey, of the 1st century AD, where Christianity was introduced by Saint Peter.

The Melkite Church, like many other Eastern Catholic particular churches, shares the Byzantine Rite with the Greek Orthodox Church of Antioch and other Eastern Orthodox churches. It is mainly centered in Syria, Lebanon, Jordan, Israel and Palestine. Melkite Greek Catholics are present, however, throughout the world by migration due to persecution. Outside the Near East, the Melkite Church has also grown through intermarriage with, and the conversion of, people of various ethnic heritages as well as transritualism. At present there is a worldwide membership of approximately 1.6 million. 

While the Melkite Catholic Church's Byzantine liturgical traditions are shared with those of Eastern Orthodoxy, the church has officially been part of the Catholic Church since re-entering communion with the Holy See under Patriarch Cyril VI Tanas in 1724. Those who rejected this move formed the extant Greek Orthodox Church of Antioch.

Name 

Melkite, from the Syriac word malkā for "King" and the Arabic word Malakī (meaning "royal", and by extension, "imperial"), was originally a pejorative term for Middle Eastern Christians who accepted the authority of the Council of Chalcedon (451) and the Byzantine Emperor, a term applied to them by non-Chalcedonians. Of the Chalcedonian churches, Greek Catholics continue to use the term, while Eastern Orthodox do not.

The Greek element signifies the Byzantine Rite heritage of the church, the liturgy used by all the Eastern Orthodox churches.

The term Catholic acknowledges communion with the Church of Rome and implies participation in the universal Christian church. According to Church tradition, the Melkite Church of Antioch is the "oldest continuous Christian community in the world".

In Arabic, the official language of the church, it is called ar-Rūm al-Kāṯūlīk. The Arabic word "Rūm" means Eastern Romans, from the Greek word "Romaioi" by which the Greek-speaking Eastern Romans (called "Byzantines" in modern parlance) had continued to identify themselves even when the Roman empire had ceased to exist elsewhere. The name literally means "Roman Catholic", confusingly for the modern English-speaker, but this does not refer to the Latin-speaking Western Catholic Church of Rome but rather to the Greek-speaking Eastern Orthodox "Byzantine" Roman heritage, the centre of gravity of which was the city of "New Rome" (Latin: Nova Roma, Greek: Νέα Ρώμη), i.e. Constantinople.

History 
According to the Melkite Greek Catholic Church, its origins go back to the establishment of Christianity in the Near East. As Christianity began to spread, the disciples preached the Gospel throughout the region and were for the first time recorded to be called "Christians" in the city of Antioch (Acts 11:26), the historical See of the Melkite Catholic Patriarchate. Scholars attribute the actual writing of the gospels in Koine Greek to the Hellenized Christian population of Antioch, with authors such as St. Luke and others. By the 2nd century, Christianity was widespread in Antioch and throughout Syria. Growth of the church did not stop during periods of persecution, and by the end of the 4th century Christianity became the official state religion.

The Melkite Greek Catholic Church traces its origins to the Christian communities of the Levant and Egypt. The church's leadership was vested in the three apostolic patriarchates of the ancient patriarchates: Alexandria, Antioch and Jerusalem.

Fallout of the Fourth Ecumenical Council
After the Fourth Ecumenical Council, the Council of Chalcedon in AD 451, fifth-century Middle-Eastern Christian society became sharply divided between those who did and those who did not accept the outcome of the council. Those who accepted the decrees of the council, the Chalcedonians, were mainly Greek-speaking city-dwellers, and were called Melkites (imperials) by the anti-Chalcedonians—who were predominantly Armenian or Coptic-speaking provincials.

Fusion with Arabic language and culture
The Battle of Yarmuk (636) took the Melkite homeland out of Byzantine control and placed it under the occupation of the Arab invaders. Whereas the Greek language and culture remained important, especially for the Melkites of Jerusalem, Antiochene Melkite tradition merged with the Arabic language and culture. Indeed, there was Arabic Christian poetry before the arrival of Islam, but the Antiochene blending with Arabic culture led to a degree of distancing from the Patriarch of Constantinople.

Despite the Arab invasion, the Melkites continued to exercise an important role in the Universal Church. The Melkites played a leading role in condemning the iconoclast controversy when it re-appeared in the early 9th century, and were among the first of the Eastern churches to respond to the introduction of the filioque clause in the West.

Communion with the Catholic Church

In 1724, Cyril VI Tanas was elected new Patriarch of Antioch. As Cyril was considered to be pro-Western, the Patriarch Jeremias III of Constantinople feared that his authority would be compromised. Therefore, Jeremias declared Cyril's election to be invalid, excommunicated him, and ordained the Greek hierodeacon Sylvester of Antioch as a priest and bishop so as to take Jeremias' place.

Sylvester exacerbated divisions with his heavy-handed rule of the church as many Melkites acknowledged Cyril's claim to the patriarchal throne. Jeremias and Sylvester began a five-year campaign of persecution against Cyril and the Melkite faithful who supported him, enforced by Ottoman Turkish troops.

Five years after the election of Cyril VI, in 1729, Pope Benedict XIII recognized him as Patriarch of Antioch and recognized his followers as being in full communion with the Catholic Church and the Pope of Rome. From this time onwards, the Melkite Greek Catholic Church has existed separately from and in parallel to the Greek Orthodox Church of Antioch in Western Asia; the latter is no longer referred to as Melkite.

The Melkite Greek Catholic Church has played an important role in the leadership of Arabic Christianity. It has always been led by Arabic-speaking Christians, whereas its Orthodox counterpart had Greek patriarchs until 1899. Indeed, at the very beginning of her separate existence, around 1725, one lay leader, theologian Abdallah Zakher of Aleppo (1684–1748) set up the first printing press in the Arab world. In 1835, Maximos III Mazloum, Melkite Greek Catholic Patriarch of Antioch, was recognized by the Ottoman Empire as the leader of a millet, a distinctive religious community within the Empire. Pope Gregory XVI gave Maximos III Mazloum the triple-patriarchate of Antioch, Alexandria and Jerusalem, a title that is still held by the leader of the Melkite Greek Catholic Church.

Expansion and participation at the First Vatican Council

In 1847, Pope Pius IX (1846–1878) reinstituted the Latin Patriarchate of Jerusalem in the person of the 34-year-old,  Giuseppe Valerga (1813–1872), whom the indigenous hierarchy nicknamed "The Butcher" because of his fierce opposition to the Eastern Orthodox churches of the Holy Land. When he arrived in Jerusalem in 1847, there were 4,200 Latin Catholics and when he died in 1872, the number had doubled.

Under pressure from the Roman curia to adopt Latin Church practices, Patriarch Clement Bahouth introduced the Gregorian calendar used by the Latin and Maronite Churches in 1857; that act caused serious problems within the Melkite church, resulting in a short-lived schism. Conflicts in the Melkite church escalated to the point where Clement abdicated his position as patriarch.

Clement's successor, Patriarch Gregory II Youssef (1864–1897), worked to restore peace within the community, successfully healing the lingering schism. He also focused on improving church institutions. During his reign Gregory founded both the Patriarchal College in Beirut in 1865 and the Patriarchal College in Damascus in 1875 and re-opened the Melkite seminary of Ain Traz in 1866. He also promoted the establishment of Saint Ann's Seminary, Jerusalem, in 1882 by the White Fathers for the training of the Melkite clergy.

Following the Hatt-ı Hümayun of 1856, decreed by Sultan Abdülmecid I, the situation of Christians in the Near East improved. This allowed Gregory to successfully encourage greater participation by the Melkite laity in both church administration as well as public affairs. Gregory also took an interest in ministering to the growing number of Melkites who had emigrated to the Americas. In 1889 he dispatched Father Ibrahim Beshawate of the Basilian Salvatorian Order in Saida, Lebanon, to New York in order to minister to the growing Syrian community there. According to historian Philip Hitte, Beshawate was the first permanent priest in the United States from the Near East from among the Melkite, Maronite, and Antiochian Orthodox churches.

Gregory was also a prominent proponent of Eastern ecclesiology at the First Vatican Council. In the two discourses he gave at the Council on May 19 and June 14, 1870, he insisted on the importance of conforming to the decisions of the Council of Florence, of not creating innovations such as papal infallibility, but accepting what had been decided by common agreement between the Greeks and the Latins at the Council of Florence, especially with regard to the issue of papal primacy. He was keenly aware of the disastrous impact that the dogmatic definition of papal infallibility would have on relations with the Eastern Orthodox Church and emerged as a prominent opponent of the dogma at the Council. He also defended the rights and privileges of the patriarchs according to the canons promulgated by earlier ecumenical councils. Speaking at the Council on May 19, 1870, Patriarch Gregory asserted:
The Eastern Church attributes to the pope the most complete and highest power, however in a manner where the fullness and primacy are in harmony with the rights of the patriarchal sees. This is why, in virtue of an ancient right founded on customs, the Roman Pontiffs did not, except in very significant cases, exercise over these sees the ordinary and immediate jurisdiction that we are asked now to define without any exception. This definition would completely destroy the constitution of the entire Greek church. That is why my conscience as a pastor refuses to accept this constitution.
Patriarch Gregory refused to sign the Council's dogmatic declaration on papal infallibility. He and the seven other Melkite bishops present voted non placet at the general congregation and left Rome prior to the adoption of the dogmatic constitution Pastor Aeternus on papal infallibility. Other members of the anti-infallibilist minority, both from the Latin church and from other Eastern Catholic churches, also left the city.

After the First Vatican Council concluded an emissary of the Roman Curia was dispatched to secure the signatures of the patriarch and the Melkite delegation. Patriarch Gregory and the Melkite bishops subscribed to it, but with the qualifying clause as used at the Council of Florence attached: "except the rights and privileges of Eastern patriarchs.". He earned the enmity of Pius IX for this. According to one account, during his next visit to the pontiff, Gregory was cast to the floor at Pius' feet by the papal guard while the pope placed his foot on the patriarch's head. This story, however, has been cast into doubt by more recent studies of the First Vatican Council. John R. Quinn cites Joseph Hajjar in his book Revered and Reviled: A Re-Examination of Vatican Council 1,: "We have been unable to find any document to provide historical verification for such treatment by the Pope." Orthodox historian A. Edward Siecienski reports that the historicity of this story "is now deeply suspect." Despite this, Patriarch Gregory and the Melkite Church remained committed to their union with the Church of Rome. Relationships with the Vatican improved following the death of Pius IX and the subsequent election of Leo XIII as pontiff. Leo's encyclical Orientalium dignitas addressed some of the Eastern Catholic Churches' concerns on latinization and the centralizing tendencies of Rome. Leo also confirmed that the limitations placed on the Armenian Catholic patriarch by Pius IX's 1867 letter Reversurus would not apply to the Melkite Church; further, Leo formally recognized an expansion of Patriarch Gregory's jurisdiction to include all Melkites throughout the Ottoman Empire.

Vatican II conflicts over Latin and Melkite traditions

Patriarch Maximos IV Sayegh took part in the Second Vatican Council where he championed the Eastern tradition of Christianity, and won a great deal of respect from Orthodox observers at the council as well as the approbation of the Ecumenical Patriarch of Constantinople, Athenagoras I.

Following the Second Vatican Council the Melkites moved to restoring traditional worship. This involved both the restoration of Melkite practices such as administering the Eucharist to infants following post-baptismal chrismation as well as removal of Latinized elements such as communion rails and confessionals. In the pre-conciliar days, the leaders of this trend were members of "The Cairo Circle", a group of young priests centered on the Patriarchal College in Cairo. This group included Fathers George Selim Hakim, Joseph Tawil, Elias Zoghby, and former Jesuit Oreste Kerame; they later became bishops and participated in the Second Vatican Council, and saw their efforts vindicated.

These reforms led to protests by some Melkite churches that the de-latinisation had gone too far. During the Patriarchate of Maximos IV (Sayegh), some Melkites in the United States objected to the use of the vernacular in the celebration of the Divine Liturgy, a movement that was spearheaded by the future archbishop of Nazareth, Father Joseph Raya of Birmingham, Alabama. The issue garnered national news coverage after Bishop Fulton Sheen celebrated a Pontifical Divine Liturgy in English at the Melkite National convention in Birmingham in 1958, parts of which were televised on the national news.

Resolution
In 1960, the issue was resolved by Pope John XXIII at the request of Patriarch Maximos IV in favour of the use of vernacular languages in the celebration of the Divine Liturgy. Pope John also consecrated a Melkite priest, Father Gabriel Acacius Coussa, as a bishop, using the Byzantine Rite and the papal tiara as a crown. Bishop Coussa was almost immediately elevated to the cardinalate, but died two years later. His cause for canonization was introduced by his religious order, the Basilian Alepian Order.

Further protests against the de-latinisation of the church occurred during the patriarchate of Maximos V Hakim (1967–2000) when some church officials who supported Latin traditions protested against allowing the ordination of married men as priests. Today the church sees itself as an authentic Orthodox church in communion with the Catholic Church. As such it has a role as a voice of the East within the western church, a bridge between faiths and peoples.

Attempts to unite the Melkite diaspora

Due to heavy emigration from the Eastern Mediterranean, which began with the Damascus massacres of 1860 in which most of the Christian communities were attacked, the Melkite Greek Catholic Church today is found throughout the world and no longer made up exclusively of faithful of Eastern Mediterranean origin.

The Patriarchate of Maximos V saw many advances in the worldwide presence of the Melkite Church, called "the Diaspora": Eparchies (the Eastern equivalent of a diocese) were established in the United States, Canada, Brazil, Australia, Argentina and Mexico in response to the continued emptying of the Eastern Mediterranean of her native Christian peoples. Some historians state that after the revolution in Egypt in 1952, many Melkites left Egypt due to the renewed Islamic, nativist and socialist policies of the Nasser regime. In 1950, the richest Melkite community in the world was in Egypt. In 1945 the most populous single diocese was Akko, Haifa, Nazareth and all Galilee.

In 1967, a native Egyptian of Syrian-Aleppin descent, George Selim Hakim, was elected the successor of Maximos IV, and took the name Maximos V. He was to reign until he retired at the age of 92 in the Jubilee Year of 2000. He reposed on the feast of Saints Peter and Paul, June 29, 2001. He was succeeded by Archbishop Lutfi Laham, who took the name Gregory III.

Melkite Greek Catholic Church is the largest Catholic community in Syria and Israel, and the second largest in Lebanon. As of 2014 the Melkite Greek Catholic Church was the largest Christian community in Israel, with roughly 60% of Israeli Christians belonging to the Melkite Greek Catholic Church. 

Due to the Christian emigration from the Middel East, São Paulo is now home to the largest Melkite community in the diaspora (estimated around 433,000), followed by Argentina (302,800). Other large Melkite communities can be found in Australia (52,000), Canada (35,000), Venezuela (25,400), the United States (24,000), and other countries. According to figures by the Holy See in 2008, Lebanon is now home to the largest Melkite community in the Middle East (425,000), followed by Syria (234,000). There are more than 80,000 Greek Melkite Catholics in Israel and Palestine, and 27,600 Greek Melkite Catholics in Jordan. The Melkite Greek Catholic Church is by far the largest Catholic church in Israe,

Organization 
The Melkite Greek Catholic Church is in full communion with the Holy See (the Latin Catholic Pope of Rome and his Roman Congregation for the Eastern Churches), where the Patriarch is represented by his Procurator at Rome, but fully follows the traditions and customs of Byzantine Christianity. The traditional languages of worship are Arabic and Greek, but today, services are held in a variety of languages, depending on the country where the church is located.

The Melkite Synod of Bishops, composed of all of the church's bishops, meets each year to consider administrative, theological and church-wide issues. The vast majority of the Melkite diocesan priests in the Middle East are married.

Patriarchate 
The current Patriarch is Youssef Absi who was elected on 21 June 2017. The patriarchate is based in the Syrian capital Damascus, but it formally remains one of the Eastern Catholic Patriarchs claiming the apostolic succession to the Ancient see of Antioch, and has been permanently granted the styles of Titular Patriarch of Alexandria and Jerusalem, two other patriarchates with multiple Catholic succession.

The patriarchate is administered by a permanent synod, which includes the Patriarch and four bishops, the ordinary tribunal of the patriarch for legal affairs, the patriarchal economos who serves as financial administrator, and a chancery.

Current dioceses and similar jurisdictions 

In the Arab World and Africa, the church has dioceses in:

 Egypt, Sudan and South Sudan, where the Patriarch of Antioch has the style of Titular Patriarch of Alexandria:
 Melkite Catholic Territory Dependent on the Patriarch of Egypt, Sudan and South Sudan, administered by a Patriarchal Vicar or Protosyncellus, titular Archeparchy of Alexandria.

 The Holy Land, where the Patriarch of Antioch has the style of Titular Patriarch of Jerusalem:
Israel: Melkite Greek Catholic Archeparchy of Akka (including Haifa, Nazareth and all Galilee)
 Palestinian territories: Melkite Catholic Territory Dependent on the Patriarch of Jerusalem
 (Trans) Jordan: Melkite Greek Catholic Archeparchy of Petra and Philadelphia in Amman and all Transjordan
 Iraq:
Melkite Greek Catholic Patriarchal Exarchate of Iraq
 Arabian Peninsula: 
Melkite Greek Catholic Patriarchal Exarchate of Kuwait
 Lebanon:
Melkite Greek Catholic Archeparchy of Baalbek
Melkite Greek Catholic Archeparchy of Baniyas and Marjeyoun (suffragan of Tyre)
Melkite Greek Catholic Archeparchy of Beirut and Byblos (nominally Metropolitan)
Melkite Greek Catholic Archeparchy of Sidon and Deir el-Kamar (suffragan of Tyre)
Melkite Greek Catholic Archeparchy of Tripoli (suffragan of Tyre)
 Metropolitan Melkite Greek Catholic Archeparchy of Tyre (with three Lebanese archiepiscopal suffragans)
Melkite Greek Catholic Archeparchy of Zahle and Forzol and all the Bekaa

 Syria: 
Melkite Greek Catholic Archeparchy of Damascus, Patriarchal See of Antioch
Melkite Greek Catholic Archeparchy of Aleppo (nominally Metropolitan)
Melkite Greek Catholic Archeparchy of Bosra and Hauran (Archeparchy of Khabab) (nominally metropolitan)
Melkite Greek Catholic Archeparchy of Homs (united with titular sees Hama and Yabroud) (nominally metropolitan)
Melkite Greek Catholic Archeparchy of Latakia and the Valley of the Christians

Throughout the rest of the world, the Melkite Greek Catholic Church has dioceses and exarchates for its diaspora in:
 Australia and New Zealand (Oceania):
 Melkite Greek Catholic Eparchy of Saint Michael Archangel in Sydney
 Turkey (Eurasia):
 Melkite Greek Catholic Patriarchal Exarchate of Istanbul
 Europe:
 Melkite Greek Catholic Parish of Saint Julien the Poor (Paris, France)
 Melkite Greek Catholic Parish of Saint Nicolas of Myra (Marseille, France)
 Melkite Greek Catholic Parish of St. John Chrysostom in Brussels (Belgium)
 Melkite Greek Catholic Parish of St. John Chrysostom in Great Britain (United Kingdom)
 Melkite Greek Catholic Parish of Stockholm (Sweden)
 Melkite Greek Catholic parish community of Vienna (Austria)
 Melkite Greek Catholic community of the Basilica of Saint Mary in Cosmedin in Rome (Italy)

 North America:
 Melkite Greek Catholic Eparchy of Saint-Sauveur in Montréal (Canada)
 Melkite Greek Catholic Eparchy of Nuestra Señora del Paraíso in Mexico City (Mexico)
 Melkite Greek Catholic Eparchy of Newton (United States of America)
 South America:
Melkite Greek Catholic Apostolic Exarchate of Argentina
 Melkite Greek Catholic Eparchy of Nossa Senhora do Paraíso em São Paulo ( Brazil, suffragan of the Latin Metropolitan of São Paulo)
 Melkite Greek Catholic Apostolic Exarchate of Venezuela, Caracas

Furthermore, one of the Ordinaries is appointed Apostolic visitor for the countries without proper ordinariate in Western Europe, while in some countries the Melkite diaspora is served pastorally by Ordinariates for all the Byzantine Rites or – for all Eastern Catholics.

Titular sees 

 Four Metropolitan Titular archbishoprics: Apamea in Syria, Cesarea in Palæstina, Edessa in Osrhoëne, Pelusium
 Six other Titular archbishoprics: Adana, Cesarea in Cappadocia, Damiata, Hama (united with current Melkite Greek Catholic Archeparchy of Homs), Hierapolis in Syria, Myra, Tarsus
 Two Episcopal Titular bishoprics: Jabrud (united with current Melkite Greek Catholic Archeparchy of Homs), Laodicea in Syria, Palmyra

Religious institutes (regular orders) 
 Basilian Aleppian Order
 Basilian Chouerite Order
 Basilian Salvatorian Order
 Melkite Paulists (fr)

Other 
There are also several patriarchal organizations with offices and chapters throughout the world, including:
 the Global Melkite Association, a group which networks eparchies, monasteries, schools and Melkite associations
 Friends of The Holy Land, a lay charitable organization active in the diaspora which provides clothing, medicine and liturgical items for churches and communities in the Holy Land (Israel, Palestine, Jordan), Lebanon, Egypt, and Syria.

Ecclesiastical decorations 

 Patriarchal Order of the Holy Cross of Jerusalem, a honorific lay order founded in 1979, with the Patriarch of Antioch as Grand Master, which promotes religious, cultural, charitable and social works of concern to the Church
 Order of Saint Nicholas, a regional lay order founded in 1991 by Bishop Ignatius Ghattas of the Melkite Greek Catholic Eparchy of Newton

Other 
 Order of Saint Lazarus of Jerusalem (OSLJ), a Christian ecumenical lay order under protection of the Patriarch of Antioch since 1910 (some sources claim since 1841)
  (OMCTH), a Christian ecumenical organisation with Generalkommandantur (general command) in Cologne (Köln), Germany, and a seat in Jerusalem, under protection of the Patriarch of Antioch since 22 September 1990. The Grand Priory of Poland of the OMCTH was granted the Autonomous Statute General on 12 December 2018 by Patriarch Youssef Absi. Grand Priory of Poland was established as the sole Catholic Chivalric Order with the Grand Prior of Poland as the Vicar General of the Order.

See also 

 Melkite
 List of Melkite Greek Catholic Patriarchs of Antioch
 Patriarch of Antioch
 Eastern Catholic Churches
 Melkite Greek Catholic Eparchy of Newton

Bibliography

References

Sources and external links 

 
Eparchy of Newton, the Melkite Church in the USA
Melkite Catholic Web Ring
Melkite Ambassadors Young Adult Website
Article on the Melkite Catholic Church by Ronald Roberson on the CNEWA website
Melkite Greek Catholic Chant in Greek, English, and Arabic

 
Apostolic sees
Catholic organizations established in the 18th century
Organizations based in Damascus